Giles Ene Malachi Phillips (born June 22, 1997) is an American professional soccer player who plays as a central defender for Irish club Waterford.

Career
Born in Chicago, Illinois, Phillips joined Queens Park Rangers from FC Barrington USA in June 2017, signing a new contract in February 2019. He had previously played college soccer for Carthage College between 2015 and 2016, becoming their first ever player to sign an international professional contract.

He moved on loan to Wycombe Wanderers in July 2019.

After being released by QPR at the end of the 2019–20 season, Phillips joined Wycombe permanently on August 20, 2020, on a one-year deal.

In November 2020, Phillips joined National League side Aldershot Town on loan until January 2021. On February 23, 2021, Phillips renewed his loan with Aldershot Town for an additional month.

On May 12, 2021, it was announced that Phillips would leave Wycombe Wanderers, having not had his contract renewed.

He returned to Aldershot Town in June 2021 on a two-year contract.

In January 2023 he signed for Irish club Waterford.

Personal life
Phillips has an English father and a Nigerian mother.

Career statistics

Honors
Wycombe Wanderers
EFL League One play-offs: 2020

References

1997 births
Living people
Soccer players from Chicago
People from Lake County, Illinois
American soccer players
American sportspeople of Nigerian descent
American people of English descent
Carthage College alumni
Queens Park Rangers F.C. players
Wycombe Wanderers F.C. players
Aldershot Town F.C. players
Waterford F.C. players
English Football League players
National League (English football) players
Association football defenders
American expatriate soccer players
Expatriate footballers in England
American expatriate sportspeople in England
Expatriate association footballers in the Republic of Ireland
American expatriates in the Republic of Ireland